Boris Melnik (2 February 1945 – 24 November 2016) was a Soviet sports shooter. He competed at the 1972 Summer Olympics and the 1976 Summer Olympics. He won a silver medal in 1972 in the 300 m rifle, three positions event.

References

External links
 

1945 births
2016 deaths
Soviet male sport shooters
Ukrainian male sport shooters
Olympic shooters of the Soviet Union
Shooters at the 1972 Summer Olympics
Shooters at the 1976 Summer Olympics
Sportspeople from Vinnytsia
Olympic silver medalists for the Soviet Union
Olympic medalists in shooting
Medalists at the 1972 Summer Olympics
Honoured Masters of Sport of the USSR